Full of Hell may refer to:

Full of Hell (band), a grindcore band formed in 2009
Full of Hell (album), a 2010 album by doom metal band Howl
"Full of Hell", a song from the 1993 album Wolverine Blues by death metal band Entombed